KVTX-LD (channel 45) is a low-power television station in Victoria, Texas, United States, affiliated with the Spanish-language Telemundo network. It is owned by Morgan Murphy Media alongside ABC affiliate KAVU-TV (channel 25) and four other low-power stations: NBC affiliate KMOL-LD (channel 17), CBS affiliate KXTS-LD (channel 41), MeTV affiliate KQZY-LD (channel 33), and Univision affiliate KUNU-LD (channel 21). Morgan Murphy Media also provides certain services Fox affiliate KVCT (channel 19) under a local marketing agreement (LMA) with SagamoreHill Broadcasting. All of the stations share studios on North Navarro Street in Victoria and transmitter facilities on Farm to Market Road 236 west of the city.

Even though KVTX-LD has a digital signal of its own, the low-power broadcasting radius only covers the immediate Victoria area. Therefore, the station can also be seen through a 16:9 widescreen standard definition simulcast on KVCT's second digital subchannel in order to reach the entire market; this signal can be seen on channel 19.2 from the same Farm to Market Road 236 transmitter site west of Victoria.

Technical information

Subchannels
The station's digital signal is multiplexed:

References

External links
Official website

Morgan Murphy Media stations
Low-power television stations in the United States
VTX-LD
Telemundo network affiliates